This is a list of films produced in the Republican period and initial Communist period of China ordered by year of release in the 1940s.

For an alphabetical listing of Chinese films see :Category:Chinese films.

1940

1941

1942

1943

1944

1945

1946

1947

1948

1949

Mainland Chinese Film Production Totals

See also
Cinema of China
Best 100 Chinese Motion Pictures as chosen by the 24th Hong Kong Film Awards

Sources
中国影片大典 Encyclopaedia of Chinese Films. 1931-1949.9, 故事片·戏曲片. (2005). Zhong guo ying pian da dian: 1931-1949.9. Beijing: 中国电影出版社 China Movie Publishing House. 
中国影片大典 Encyclopaedia of Chinese Films. 1949.10-1976, 故事片·戏曲片. (2001). Zhong guo ying pian da dian: 1949.10-1976. Beijing: 中国电影出版社 China Movie Publishing House.

References

External links
IMDb list of Chinese films

1940s
Films
Chinese